Local elections were held in Makati on May 10, 2010, within the Philippine general election. The voters will elect for the elective local posts in the city: the mayor, vice mayor, two District representatives, and councilors, eight in each of the city's two legislative districts.

Mayoral and vice mayoral election
Incumbents Jejomar Binay and Ernesto Mercado were on their third consecutive term as mayor and vice mayor of Makati, respectively. Mercado announced that he is running for the mayorship of the city, while Binay decided to run for vice president as the running mate of former President Joseph Estrada of the Pwersa ng Masang Pilipino party. Binay and Mercado had confirmed their parting in December 2009 when the latter moved to the Nacionalista Party. His running mate was ABC President and Barangay Valenzuela Chairman Romulo Peña, Jr., who is running as an independent.

Binay's only son, Jejomar Erwin, Jr., ran for mayor as a candidate of PDP–Laban. He served as the city councilor from the 1st District since 1992. His running mate was singer and former 1st District city councilor Rico J. Puno. Puno served as councilor from the 1st District from 1998 to 2007.

Former Senator and 2nd District Congressman Agapito Aquino ran as an independent candidate. He and mayoralty candidates Binay and Mercado used to be political allies with the outgoing mayor. He became senator from 1987 to 1995 and congressman for three consecutive terms from 1998 to 2007. His running mate was Miguel Yabut, Jr., the eldest grandson of late Mayor Nemesio Yabut.

Atty. Erwin Genuino also ran for mayor as a candidate of Bigkis Pinoy. He is the eldest son of PAGCOR Chairman Efraim C. Genuino. His running mate was actress Jobelle Salvador.

Other candidate running for mayor was actor Eddie Tagalog, an independent candidate. He is known for his role in the 1992 film Pulis Makati.

Congressional elections

There will be two candidates for the congressman or district representative post of each of the districts of Makati. The city is divided into two congressional districts: the first district and the second district.

The incumbent first district representative Teodoro Locsin, Jr. was on his third consecutive term and was ineligible to seek reelection. His party, which is the PDP–Laban, nominated outgoing councilor Monique Lagdameo. Locsin's wife, Maria Lourdes, was nominated by the Liberal Party. They faced former councilors Oscar Ibay and Robert Dean Barbers, and Oswaldo Carbonell.

For the second district, the incumbent representative Abigail Binay ran under the PDP–Laban party. She was elected in 2007 replacing Agapito Aquino. She opposed outgoing councilor Ernesto Aspillaga and John Christian Montes.

Opinion polls
Commissioned by Victor Limlingan, Jr., Social Weather Stations conducted one survey in the city from April 7 to 9, 2010, with a sample size of 600, divided equally on Makati's two districts (300 each), with a sampling error of ±4% for the entire city and ±6% for both districts.

Candidates

Team Binay

United Action Team

Results
The candidates for mayor and vice mayor with the highest number of votes wins the seat; they are voted separately, therefore, they may be of different parties when elected.

Mayoral election results
Genuino placed the result of the election under protest in the Mayoral Electoral Tribunal.

Vice Mayoral election results

Notes
 A^ Peña is Mercado's (Nacionalista) guest candidate.
 The Team Binay wing is under Partido ng Masang Pilipino (PMP), with Jojo Binay as guest vice presidential candidate.
 Ernesto Mercado's United Action Team (UNA) is a Nacionalista Party affiliate, although Maria Lourdes Locsin, the party candidate for 1st District congresswoman, is also a Liberal Party and Lakas-Kampi CMD member.

Congressional election results

1st District
Incumbent Teodoro Locsin, Jr. is in his third consecutive term already and is ineligible for reelection. Makati councilor Monique Lagdameo is his party's nominee of UNO for the seat although his wife Maria Lourdes was a nominee of the United Opposition.

2nd District
Abigail Binay is the incumbent.

City Council elections
Each of Makati's two legislative districts elects eight councilors to the City Council. The eight candidates with the highest number of votes wins the seats per district. Some who are running are celebrities.

Summary

1st District

|-bgcolor=black
|colspan=5|

2nd District

|-bgcolor=black
|colspan=5|

References

External links
 Certified List of Candidates for Congressional and Local Positions in Makati

2010 Philippine local elections
Elections in Makati
2010 elections in Metro Manila